Eupithecia prostrata is a moth in the family Geometridae. It is found in California and Arizona.

References

Moths described in 1938
prostrata
Moths of North America